Shirley Scheibla was a journalist for The Wall Street Journal from 1943 to 1948 and for Barron's from 1962 until her retirement in 1992.

Journalism career
Shirley H. Scheibla was the first female reporter at The Wall Street Journal, hired during World War II as an economics reporter in Washington DC. During her Wall Street Journal tenure, she used her initials "S.S. Scheibla" until she was married, after which she used "S.H. Scheibla". Editors at The Wall Street Journal at the time were not sure whether she would be taken seriously by readers if it was known she was a woman. It wasn't until her 1995 article, written in her retirement, that she got a byline with her full name.

Her journalism included news articles and editorials that led to government investigations. She also reported on consumer and environment beats. Shirley's most important articles included the conversion of ice cream makers into frozen vegetable producers in 1943, red meat consumption in 1943, implications of Philippine independence in 1945, the U.S. government helping small businesses in 1945, increases in wages in 1947 and 1948 and happenings in the world of unions.

In 1968, she published the book Poverty is Where the Money Is with Arlington House.

Public activism
While in retirement, she founded Partners for Patients, a nonprofit organization to educate the public about the world of hospitals and caregivers. She announced its founding in a 1995 article in The Wall Street Journal. This article spurred a series of Letters to the Editor, in particular about the diagnosis rate she cited, which may have been incorrect. In her article, she described her personal experience of visiting a hospital 10 times without a correct diagnosis of what was making her sick, and then about her husband's fatal illness. These experiences sparked her exploration into the health system and an interest in improving it.

References 

The Wall Street Journal people
Dow Jones & Company people
American women journalists
Founders of charities
20th-century American journalists
20th-century American women writers